Davide Buzzi (David Buzzi) (born 31 December 1968 in Acquarossa, Switzerland) is a Swiss singer-songwriter and a part of the Swiss Italian scene.
In 1991 David was a finalist in a competition organized by Swiss Television RSI with the song "Lettera dal carcere," which included as part of a CD compilation.
In 1993 he produced his first CD "Da grande".
In 1994 The Swiss Television RSI produced a documentary about Romaneschi (a character who is in one of his songs) and he and this documentary were shown on 14 European channels for the European Magazine "Alice".
In 1997 he received the international award "Targa Città di Milano".
In 1998 he recorded his second CD "Il Diavolo Rosso: Romaneschi”. This time David worked with a variety of musicians. The same year he won the "Festival of Lissone" with the song "Ul Veget di Mariunet" and received a special prize for the best lyrics and music.
In July 1999 he went on tour in Sweden with the Swedish band "Mad Max".
In October 2000 he received the international award "Premio San Bonifacio" in Italy.
In February 2002 in Sanremo he received the "Myrta Gabardi award" in the section Talenti e Voci internazionali (International Talents and e Voices).
In 2005, after some years spent in tournee in Europe.
In 2006 arrives the CD "Perdo i pezzi".
In 2012 was nominated for two "ISMA Awards" Indian Summer Music Awards in Milwaukee (USA), for the song "The She Wolf".
In 2013 was nominated for one "NAMA Awards" (NAMMY) Native American Music Awards in Niagara Falls (USA), for the song "The She Wolf".
In 2016 arrives the revised edition of the single "Romaneschi".
In 2017 he released his fourth CD Non ascoltare in caso d'incendio. 
In 2021 he released his fifth CD Radiazioni sonore artificiali non coerente.

Discography
 1993 – Da grande (Album)
 1998 – Il Diavolo Rosso (Album)
 2006 – Perdo i pezzi (Album)
 2016 – Romaneschi (single)
 2017 – Te ne vai (single)
 2017 – Non ascoltare in caso d'incendio (Album)
 2020 – Dont cross the rails (single)
 2021 – Radiazioni sonore artificiali non coerenti (Album)
 2021 – Come stai? (single)
 2021 – americanfly.chat with Franco Ambrosetti (single)

Duets
 With Leningrad Cowboys: Gringo (original title "Ten lost gringos")
 With Leandro Barsotti: La borsa degli scudi
 With Massimo Priviero: Nessuna resa mai
 With Yolanda Martinez: Il ponte (The bridge)
 With Massimo Priviero: Salvatore Fiumara
 With Dario Gay: Non ti scordare di me
 With Franco Ambrosetti: americanfly.chat

Books 
 2013 : Il mio nome è Leponte... Johnny Leponte (96, Rue de-La-Fontaine Edizioni)
 2017 : La multa (ARBOK / ANA Edizioni)
 2020 : Antonio Scalonesi - Memoriale di un anomalo omicida seriale (96, Rue de-La-Fontaine Edizioni)
 2021 : L'estate di Achille (Morellini Editore)

Filmography
 1982 – L'oro nel camino, directed by Nelo Risi
 1995 – Romaneschi, directed by Bruno Soldini
 2018 – Non ascoltare in caso d'incendio, directed by Dimitris Statiris

External links

Sources 
<references>

</ref>

</references>

1968 births
Living people
Swiss singer-songwriters